The 2011–12 EHF Women's Champions League knockout stage ran from 31 March to 13 May 2012. The top two placed teams from the main round advanced to the semifinals.

Semifinals

|}

First leg

Second leg

Notes
Note 1: Győri Audi ETO KC will play their home match on Veszprém Aréna in Veszprém as it has a greater capacity than their own Magvassy Mihály Sportcsarnok from Győr.

Final

|}

First leg

Second leg

Notes
Note 1: Győri Audi ETO KC will play their home match on Veszprém Aréna in Veszprém as it has a greater capacity than their own Magvassy Mihály Sportcsarnok from Győr.

References

External links
EHF Site

2011–12 Women's EHF Champions League